Santiago López may refer to:

 Santiago López (footballer, born 1982), Uruguayan forward
 Santiago López (footballer, born 1989), Argentine midfielder
 Santiago López (footballer, born 1991), Uruguayan midfielder
 Santiago López (footballer, born 1992), Mexican midfielder
 Santiago López (footballer, born August 1997), Argentine defender
 Santiago López (footballer, born December 1997), Argentine midfielder